Northorpe is a hamlet in the civil parish of Thurlby, in the South Kesteven district of Lincolnshire, England.

The village lies on the bus route between Bourne and Peterborough, run by Delaine along the A15.

Village amenities include a post box and a telephone box, although the telephone box has been disconnected by British Telecom and now adopted by the Parish Council.

Northorpe is near to Elsea and Math Woods, the latter associated with the tale of Nanny Rutt.

Thomas Minot, later Archbishop of Dublin,  became parson here in 1349.

See also
 Northorpe near Donington in South Holland
 Northorpe near Gainsborough in West Lindsey

References

External links

Hamlets in Lincolnshire
South Kesteven District